Narcotan is a trade name for two different drugs:

 Halothane, a general anesthetic 
 Naloxone, a medication used to reverse the effects of opioids